Maduwanwela Walawwa is a Walauwa located in Ratnapura District, Sabaragamuwa Province, Sri Lanka.

History
Maduwanwela Walawwa dates back to the reign of King Wimaladharmasuriya II (1687-1707 AD). It was built by Maduwanwela Maha Mohottala in the 1700s and was expanded numerous times by the Maduwanwela family until 1905 when the final expansion was undertaken by Maduwanwela Maha Disawe.

The building
During 1877-1905 period, the Walawwa had 121 rooms, 21 inner courtyards (Meda Midula) and 80 000 acres of land surrounding it, at present there are on 43 rooms left. Located on in the grounds is a courthouse with seating space for 100 people, furniture and the equipment used for punishments are still present. Following the death of Maduwanwela Maha Disawe, the last of the Maduwanwela family, the house was transferred to Sir Francis Molamure. In 1974, it was transferred to the state and taken over by the Department of Archaeological and converted into a museum.

References

External links
Maduwanwela Walawwa, Amazing Lanka
Maduwanwela Walawwa, Sri Lanka Heritages

Archaeological protected monuments in Ratnapura District
Houses completed in 1725
Houses in Ratnapura District